Carol Mokgadi Phiri is a South African politician who has been a Member of Parliament (MP) for the African National Congress.

References 

Living people
Members of the National Assembly of South Africa
Women members of the National Assembly of South Africa
African National Congress politicians
21st-century South African women politicians
21st-century South African politicians
Year of birth missing (living people)